KNCC may refer to:

 KNCC (FM), a radio station in Elko, Nevada, United States
Kuwait National Cinema Company, a former name of Cinescape